Sakoyisa Makata (born ) is a South African rugby sevens player for the South Africa national team, where his regular position is a forward.

Biography 
Makata attended Stirling High School in East London, where he played rugby for the school's first team, also representing Border at the Under-18 Craven Week in 2016.

After playing for the Sevens Academy side from 2017 to 2019, Makata was also included in the South Africa national sevens squad prior to the 2018–19 World Rugby Sevens Series. In February 2019, He was named in the Blitzboks squad for the Las Vegas Sevens, and he made his debut in their opening match in that tournament, a 26–0 victory over Japan.

Makata was part of the South African team that won their second Commonwealth Games gold medal in Birmingham in 2022.

References

External links

South African rugby union players
Living people
1998 births
Rugby union wings
South Africa international rugby sevens players
Rugby sevens players at the 2020 Summer Olympics
Olympic rugby sevens players of South Africa
Rugby sevens players at the 2022 Commonwealth Games
Commonwealth Games gold medallists for South Africa
Commonwealth Games medallists in rugby sevens
Medallists at the 2022 Commonwealth Games